Pallares or Pallarés is a Spanish surname. Notable people with the surname include:

Danilo Pallares Echeverría, Uruguayan writer and musician
Juan Carlos Pallares Bueno, Mexican politician
Judith Pallarés i Cortés, Andorran politician
Luis Manuel Arias Pallares, Mexican politician
Margarita Pérez Pallares, former First Lady of Ecuador
Michael-Ray Pallares González, Dominican tennis player
Pablo Pallarés, Spanish footballer
Rodrigo Pallares, Ecuadorian architect
Santiago Pallares, Uruguayan footballer

See also
 
 Coalcomán de Vázquez Pallares, municipality in Mexico

Catalan-language surnames
Spanish-language surnames